Tianjun County is a county of Qinghai Province, China, bordering Gansu Province to the north. It is under the administration of the Haixi Mongol and Tibetan Autonomous Prefecture. The county seat in Xinyuan Town.

Climate

Economy
The county is served by the Qinghai–Tibet Railway; its Tianjun railway station is located near the county seat, Xinyuan Town.

Large coalfields are worked near Muli Town in the northern part of the county, at the elevation around 4,000 m above the sea level.

References

County-level divisions of Qinghai
Haixi Mongol and Tibetan Autonomous Prefecture